The greater long-tailed shrew tenrec (Microgale principula) is a species of mammal in the family Tenrecidae. It is endemic to Madagascar, where its natural habitats are subtropical or tropical moist forests.

Distribution and habitat
It is an arboreal species and is found in both primary and somewhat degraded humid forests.

Andrahomana Cave
The greater long-tailed shrew tenrec is one of eight species of Microgale tenrecs whose remains have been found in deposits in caverns at Andrahomana on the southern coast of Madagascar alongside the bones of extinct birds including elephant birds and Malagasy sheldgoose. The latter, a waterbird, indicates that a large body of fresh water may have been nearby and moister conditions were probably present in the past. The creatures may have fallen into the cave system through "skylights" in the roof. The cave is outside the present day range of the greater long-tailed shrew tenrec.

Status
Besides the risk of wildfire, the main threats faced by the greater long-tailed shrew tenrec are destruction of its forest habitat by logging and by its conversion into agricultural land. However the animal's range is wide, it is common in many places and presumably has a large total population, and it is present in a number of protected areas, so the International Union for Conservation of Nature has assessed its conservation status as being of "least concern".

References

Afrosoricida
Mammals of Madagascar
Mammals described in 1926
Taxa named by Oldfield Thomas
Taxonomy articles created by Polbot